Eric Ouma Otieno (born 27 September 1996) is a Kenyan international footballer who plays for Swedish club AIK. Mainly a left back, he can also be deployed in all other positions on the left side.

Club career
Born in Nairobi, Ouma signed a six-month contract with Gor Mahia in January 2016, before renewing it until the end of the year during the summer. Ouma left Gor Mahia at the end of his contract, going on to sign a six-month contract with Georgian club Kolkheti Poti in January 2017. In February 2018 he moved to Albanian club KS Kastrioti, and by September 2018 he was playing for Swedish club Vasalund, for whom he made 22 appearances, scoring 2 goals.

He moved to AIK for the 2020 season.

International career
Ouma made his international debut for Kenya in 2016. He was a squad member at the 2019 Africa Cup of Nations.

International statistics

References

External links

1996 births
Living people
Footballers from Nairobi
Kenyan footballers
Association football fullbacks
Gor Mahia F.C. players
FC Kolkheti-1913 Poti players
KS Kastrioti players
Vasalunds IF players
AIK Fotboll players
Kenyan Premier League players
Division 2 (Swedish football) players
Ettan Fotboll players
Kenya international footballers
2019 Africa Cup of Nations players
Kenyan expatriate footballers
Kenyan expatriate sportspeople in Georgia (country)
Kenyan expatriate sportspeople in Albania
Kenyan expatriate sportspeople in Sweden
Expatriate footballers in Georgia (country)
Expatriate footballers in Albania
Expatriate footballers in Sweden